6-Chloro-2-aminotetralin (6-CAT) is a drug which acts as a selective serotonin releasing agent (SSRA) and is a putative entactogen in humans. It is a rigid analogue of para-chloroamphetamine (PCA).

According to Nichols et al., 6-CAT is a non-neurotoxic analog of PCA.

See also 
 2-Aminotetralin

References 

Entactogens and empathogens
Aminotetralins
Chloroarenes
Serotonin releasing agents